Austerlitz is a 2016 German documentary film written and directed by Sergei Loznitsa. It premiered out of competition at the 73rd edition of the Venice Film Festival. It deals with the Holocaust by observing visitors at the Nazi concentration camps of Sachsenhausen and Dachau. The title is a hint at W.G. Sebald's Austerlitz novel.

Reception

Critical response
Austerlitz has an approval rating of 91% on review aggregator website Rotten Tomatoes, based on 11 reviews, and an average rating of 6.83/10.

References

External links

2016 films
2016 documentary films
German documentary films
Documentary films about the Holocaust
Films directed by Sergei Loznitsa
German prison films
2010s German films